Alexander Petersson (born Aleksandrs Pētersons 2 July 1980) is a Latvian-born Icelandic former handball player. He was a member of the Icelandic national team from 2005 to 2021, appearing in 186 games.

Alexander was voted the Icelandic Sportsperson of the Year in 2010 by the Icelandic Sport Press Association. He is of Latvian and Baltic German origin.

Early life
Alexander was born in Riga in Latvia SSR in 1980. He emigrated to Iceland at age of 18 in 1998 to play for Grótta/KR. In 2005, he played for the Iceland men's national handball team for the first time.

Individual awards
 Icelandic Sportsperson of the Year: 2010
 All-Star Right back of the World Championship: 2011

References

External links

Alexander Peterssons profile at rhein-neckar-loewen.de

Latvian male handball players
Alexander Petersson
Handball players at the 2008 Summer Olympics
Handball players at the 2012 Summer Olympics
Alexander Petersson
Alexander Petersson
Recipients of the Order of the Falcon
1980 births
Living people
Olympic medalists in handball
Alexander Petersson
Alexander Petersson
Medalists at the 2008 Summer Olympics
Sportspeople from Riga
SG Flensburg-Handewitt players
Füchse Berlin Reinickendorf HBC players
Rhein-Neckar Löwen players
Handball-Bundesliga players
Expatriate handball players
Alexander Petersson
Grótta men's handball players